Karl Ludwig (born November 25, 1988) is a Canadian ice sledge hockey player. He won a bronze medal at the 2014 Winter Paralympics in Sochi, Russia.

Personal life

Started playing sledge hockey in 1995 with the Halton-Peel Cruisers.

He attended Humber College in Toronto from 2006-2008 for Tourism Management and again from 2011-2013 for Comedy Writing and Performance.

Career

Ludwig won a gold medal at the 2013 IPC Ice Sledge Hockey World Championships and won a bronze medal at the 2014 Winter Paralympics in Sochi, Russia.

Karl will be putting on a one man show on Broadway about the early years of the Golden Girls, in late June 2017.

References

External links 
 
 

1988 births
Living people
Canadian sledge hockey players
Paralympic sledge hockey players of Canada
Paralympic bronze medalists for Canada
Ice sledge hockey players at the 2014 Winter Paralympics
Medalists at the 2014 Winter Paralympics
Ice hockey people from Ontario
Paralympic medalists in sledge hockey